Boy Scout Handbook is the official handbook of Scouts BSA. It is a descendant of Baden-Powell's original handbook, Scouting for Boys, which has been the basis for Scout handbooks in many countries, with some variations to the text of the book depending on each country's codes and customs.

The handbook opens by introducing the Scout Oath, The Scout Motto, The Scout Law, the Scout Slogan.

The original edition of the handbook was based on Baden-Powell's work. Ernest Thompson Seton combined his Woodcraft manual, the Birch Bark Rolls, with Baden-Powell's Scouting for Boys. Subsequent works were done by other authors. William "Green Bar Bill" Hillcourt wrote the 6th, 7th, and 9th editions. Frederick L. Hines wrote the 8th, and Robert Birkby the 10th, 11th and 12th editions.

1910 original edition Handbook
The first Official Handbook, subtitled A Handbook of Woodcraft, Scouting, and Life-craft was published from July 1910 until March 1911 and appeared in eight distinct variations. It was written by Ernest Seton and drew greatly on Baden-Powell's Scouting for Boys, it included information on the organization of Scouting, signs and signaling, and camping, as well as Scouting games and a description of several Scouting honours. Notably, this book did not place emphasis on first aid, knife and axe use, or map and compass work, as later editions would.  Because this edition was intended solely as a temporary guide until an authoritative handbook could be made, it is now known as the 1910 Original Edition Handbook.  The cover art was an illustration by Baden-Powell. There were about 28,000 copies printed, not 68,900 as previously thought.

First edition
The Official Handbook for Boys was published in June 1911. In this edition, the American Scouting program was standardized, albeit with many omissions and mistakes (cf. external links). As with the Original Edition, many now-standard Scouting skills were passed over, including knife and axe use and map and compass work.

The book describes many Scout-like virtues and qualifications. After a lengthy section on what a Scout should know, including chivalry, history, and national issues, it is noted that "in short, to be a good Scout is to be a well-developed, well-informed boy."

Scouts BSA
The Boy Scouting program began admitting girls in 2019 and was renamed Scouts BSA. The handbook was renamed the Scouts BSA Handbook. It is available in two editions with identical content but one with photos of boys and one of girls.

Later editions
Dates and names of the various editions are:

; an extract of the standard handbook for use as a temporary advancement record

References

External links

 
 
 
Peterson, Robert (September 1999). The Perfect Book for a Desert Island. Scouting Magazine.
 
 
  (1911 first edition)

1910 non-fiction books
Literature of the Boy Scouts of America
Handbooks and manuals
Ernest Thompson Seton